The Siren is a sculpture by Norman J. Gitzen in Wellington, Florida. It consists of a 3-metre tall hand-pounded steel and bronze depiction of a mermaid with webbed hands and unusually large breasts. It is part of the village's public art program, which involves 21 artists loaning art work to be displayed in public places. Originally placed outside Wellington Community Centre, it was moved to a new site outside a swimming pool after some complaints about the nudity of the statue.  The artist later added nipples to the sculpture's breasts.

External links
 Banderas News

Outdoor sculptures in Florida
Buildings and structures in Palm Beach County, Florida
2005 sculptures
Steel sculptures in Florida
Bronze sculptures in Florida
Wellington, Florida
2005 establishments in Florida